is a Japanese actor, voice actor and narrator from Saitama Prefecture, Japan.

Biography
Kakegawa was born on October 11, 1959, in Saitama Prefecture. He graduated from Waseda University. After university he primarily worked in local government, until he decided to quit his job and become a voice actor. He debuted in the television anime Saint Seiya. Kakegawa hid his change in career from his parents until they discovered his deception after seeing his name in the credits for Gegege no Kitaro.

Filmography

Anime

Anime film

Video games

Dubbing

Live action Japanese dubbing

Animation Japanese dubbing

Discography

References

External links
Official agency profile 

1959 births
Living people
Japanese male video game actors
Japanese male voice actors
Male voice actors from Saitama Prefecture
Waseda University alumni
20th-century Japanese male actors
21st-century Japanese male actors